Timilpan is a municipality in Mexico State in Mexico. The municipal seat is the town of San Andrés Timilpan which is the fourth largest town in the municipality.  The municipality covers an area of  179.82 km2.

As of 2005, the municipality had a total population of 14,335.

References

Municipalities of the State of Mexico
Populated places in the State of Mexico